Moments  is the second album by Norwegian pop singer Christine Guldbrandsen, released in 2004 in Norway and through Sony BMG Entertainment Norway.

Album information 
This album was not as well received as Guldbrandsen's debut album, but it still managed to reach the Top 40 albums list in 2004.

Reviews 

The review of the album on the Musical Discoveries website states "The first thing listeners will notice of the album, especially when comparing it to Surfing In The Air is the more classy recording style. Perhaps to appeal to a broader audience, rock and pop references are not overwhelming, but that's not to say that songs are without guitar or other instrumental solos... Moments is a superb follow-up album!"

Track listing

References 

2004 albums
Christine Guldbrandsen albums